Otto Bachman was an Italian luger who competed in the late 1970s and early 1980s. A natural track luger, he won two medals in the men's singles event at the FIL World Luge Natural Track Championships (Silver: 1982, Bronze: 1980).

Bachmann found better success at the FIL European Luge Natural Track Championships where he won three medals in the men's singles event with two gold (1981, 1983) and one silver (1979).

As of 2008, he works as a sled constructor in Austria.

References
Natural track European Championships results 1970-2006.
Natural track World Championships results: 1979-2007

External links
  

Italian lugers
Italian male lugers
Living people
Year of birth missing (living people)
People from Innichen
Sportspeople from Südtirol